Victoria Andreyevna Zavadovskaya  (born 16 January 1996) is a Russian freestyle skier.
 
She competed in the 2017 FIS Freestyle World Ski Championships, and in the 2018 Winter Olympics, in ski cross.

References

External links

1996 births
Living people
Russian female freestyle skiers 
Olympic freestyle skiers of Russia 
Freestyle skiers at the 2018 Winter Olympics 
Sportspeople from Kalmykia